WROK (1440 kHz) is an American news/talk AM radio station in Rockford, Illinois.  It is owned by Townsquare Media.  The station is licensed by the Federal Communications Commission (FCC) to serve Winnebago County, Illinois.

On August 30, 2013, a deal was announced in which Townsquare would acquire 53 Cumulus Media stations, including WROK, for $238 million. The deal is part of Cumulus' acquisition of Dial Global; Townsquare and Dial Global are both controlled by Oaktree Capital Management. The transaction was consummated effective November 14, 2013.

Programming
The station features America in the Morning with John Trout (Tuesday to Saturday 4:00 to 5:00 am), followed by Riley O'Neil for the morning drive-time broadcast (Monday to Friday 5:00 to 9:00 am and Saturday 6:00 to 7:00 am).

The Michael Koolidge Show (http://www.koolidge.com) airs after Riley O'Neil's morning show (Monday to Friday 9:00 to 11:00 am, with a one-hour "best of" program every Sunday 6:00 to 7:00 pm). The Sean Hannity Show is broadcast from 2:00 to 5:00 pm. The Sean Hannity Weekend airs every Saturday 3:00 to 6:00 pm.

The Mark Levin Show airs live (5:00 to 8:00 pm), followed by The Larry Elder Show (Monday to Friday 8:00 to 11:00 pm and Saturday 6:00 to 9:00 pm) until The Dave Ramsey Show (11:00 pm to 12:00 midnight and Sunday 12:00 noon to 3:00 pm). Red Eye Radio is broadcast overnight (Tuesday to Friday and Sunday 12:00 midnight to 4:00 am and Saturday and Monday 12:00 midnight to 5:00 am).

Weekends feature This Weekend: America's First News with Gordon Deal (Saturday 5:00 to 6:00 am), The Kim Komando Show (Sunday 9:00 am to 12:00 noon), The Larry Kudlow Show (Saturday 9:00 am to 12:00 noon), The Money Pit (Saturday 9:00 to 11:00 pm), Made in America (Sunday 4:00 to 7:00 am), The Twilight Zone Radio Dramas (Sunday 7:00 to 9:00 pm), Live on Sunday Night, It's Bill Cunningham (Sunday 9:00 pm to 12:00 midnight), Moneytalk with Bob Brinker (Sunday 3:00 to 6:00 pm), Viewpoints (Saturday 11:00 to 11:30 pm), Eye on Illinois (Saturday 11:30 pm to 12:00 midnight), Stateline Sports Hour (Saturday 7:00 to 8:00 am), Saturday Morning Stateline (Saturday 8:00 to 9:00 am) and religious programming every Sunday from 7:00 to 9:00 am.

WROK broadcasts University of Illinois football and basketball, and selected NFL games during the regular season.

WROK was a very popular Top 40 music station in Rockford during the 1970s.  Sister station WZOK carries on the Top 40 heritage, although that station's format has shifted toward Hot Adult Contemporary in recent years.

The WROK callsign was used in the movie "Down Periscope (1996)". During the scene where Nitro (Toby Huss) is making a call fingering wire connections to Admiral Graham (Bruce Dern) for Captain Dodge (Kelsey Grammer) Nitro passes the phone to Captain Dodge. Captain Dodge is then heard saying "Stairway to Heaven, Led Zeppelin, 1971."  He passes the phone back to Nitro saying he answered the WROK question of the day, followed by "Now get me Admiral Graham."

WROK rebroadcasts on FM translator station W241DF at 96.1 Mhz.

References

External links
FCC History Cards for WROK

News and talk radio stations in the United States
ROK
Radio stations established in 1923
1923 establishments in Illinois
Townsquare Media radio stations